La moglie in bianco... l'amante al pepe is a 1980 commedia sexy all'italiana directed by Michele Massimo Tarantini.

Plot
Gianluca, the son of the dentist Baron Peppino Patané, performs unmanly attitudes. The old grandfather Calogero, shortly before his death, makes it a condition to the heritage collection Gianluca's marriage and, above all, the quick birth of a son. After a series of bawdy adventures, Gianluca marries a former stripper and becomes a father.

Cast 

Lino Banfi: Giuseppe 'Peppino' Patanè / Calogero Patanè
Pamela Prati:  Sonia 
Marisa Porcel: Maria, wife of Peppino
Javier Viñas: Gianluca 
Raf Baldassarre: Cosimo Mancuso 
Susan Scott: Lia, wife of  Cosimo
Ria De Simone: Linda

References

External links

1980 films
Commedia sexy all'italiana
Films directed by Michele Massimo Tarantini
1980s sex comedy films
1980 comedy films
1980s Italian-language films
1980s Italian films